Lahore Chronicle was newspaper founded in 1849 in Lahore, British India. It is the first newspaper to be published in modern Pakistan.It founded by Syed Muhammad Azim.

References

Publications established in 1849
Newspapers published in India
Newspapers published in Pakistan
English-language newspapers